Sunny (lit. "My Dear is Far Away") is a 2008 South Korean film directed by Lee Joon-ik. Soo Ae plays the titular Soon-yi, whose husband enlists to fight in the Vietnam War, and she decides to join a singing group that will travel to Vietnam to perform for the soldiers there.

Plot 
Soon-yi is a young woman stuck in an arranged marriage to a man who still loves his college girlfriend. Her husband, Sang-gil, is a soldier in the South Korean army, and though she visits him regularly, he does not return her affections. After Sang-gil is sent to fight in the Vietnam War, Soon-yi resolves to follow him. She joins a band which is heading there, where she sings for the soldiers as "Sunny", with the hope of being reunited with her husband.

Cast 
 Soo Ae ... Soon-yi/Sunny
 Jung Jin-young ... Kim Jeong-man, band leader
 Jung Kyung-ho ... Yong-deuk, bassist
 Joo Jin-mo ... Seong-chan, guitarist
 Shin Hyeon-tak ... Cheol-sik, drummer
 Uhm Tae-woong ... Sang-gil, Sunny's husband
 Park Yoon-ho ... Private Kim
 Lee Joo-sil ... Mother-in-law
 Jo Mi-ryung ... Jeni
 Shin Jung-geun ... Battalion commander
 Fredrik Skalin ... Soldier

Production 
Director Lee Joon-ik made the protagonist female in response to criticism that his films were largely male-oriented. Lee cast Soo Ae in the lead role, saying, "No other actress in [South] Korea has the distinctively pure image that [she] has". Soo Ae did two months of training to refine her singing and dancing skills, and admitted to being concerned over whether or not she could pull off the character.

Release 
Sunny was released in South Korea on July 23, 2008. On its opening weekend it was ranked second at the box office with 480,144 admissions, and exceeded the one million mark on July 19.

Awards and nominations

References

External links 
  
 
 
 

2008 films
2000s musical drama films
South Korean musical drama films
Vietnam War films
South Korean war drama films
Films about music and musicians
Films set in 1971
Films set in Vietnam
Films shot in Busan
Films shot in Thailand
Films directed by Lee Joon-ik
2000s Korean-language films
Showbox films
2008 drama films
2000s South Korean films
2000s war drama films